The women's competition in 63 kg division was staged on September 22–23, 2007.

Schedule

Medalists

Records

Results

New records

References
Results 

Women's 63
World